Federal elections were held in Switzerland on 25 October 1959. The Social Democratic Party and the Free Democratic Party emerged as the largest parties in the National Council, each winning 51 of the 196 seats.

Results

National Council

By constituency

Council of the States
In several cantons the members of the Council of the States were chosen by the cantonal parliaments.

References

Switzerland
1959 in Switzerland
Federal elections in Switzerland
Federal
Swiss